Love Again is a 2012 South Korean television series starring Kim Ji-soo, Ryu Jung-han, Choi Cheol-ho and Lee Ah-hyun. It is a remake of the 2010 Japanese television series Class Reunion: Love Again Syndrome. The series aired on JTBC from April 25 to June 14, 2012.

Synopsis
At the reunion of an astronomy club, friends meet again for the first time in 30 years. As they recall their golden days, they start having feelings for each other.

Cast

Main
 Kim Ji-soo as Im Ji-hyun
 Ryu Jung-han as Seo Young-wook
 Choi Cheol-ho as Lee Tae-jin
 Lee Ah-hyun as Kim Mi-hee

Supporting
 Kim Jin-geun as Kim Woo-chul
 Yoon Ye-hee as Park Seon-joo
 Oh Jae-ik as Yang Jong-ha
 Jeon No-min as Jung Seon-gyu
 Yoo Tae-woong as Jung Jae-gyu
 Kim So-hyun as Jung Yoo-ri
 Kang Yi-seok as Jung Yoo-joon
 Jeon Hye-soo as Oh Soo-jin
 Lee In-sung as Seo Min-jae
 Yoon Da-gyeong as Nam Si-yeong

Ratings
In this table,  represent the lowest ratings and  represent the highest ratings.

References

External links
  
 
 

JTBC television dramas
Korean-language television shows
2012 South Korean television series debuts
2012 South Korean television series endings
South Korean romance television series
Adultery in television
South Korean television series based on Japanese television series
Television series by Drama House